Below is a list of Massachusetts state high school baseball champions sanctioned by the Massachusetts Interscholastic Athletic Association since the organization began holding state championship games in 1934.

State Champions

Most Championships

See also 
 List of Massachusetts state high school football champions

References 

High school champions
Massachusetts champions
Massachusetts Interscholastic Athletic Association
High school baseball champions